Francis Martin (3 January 1887 – 5 July 1967) was an English professional footballer who played in the Football League for Grimsby Town, Hull City and Aberdare Athletic as a left half and right back.

Personal life 
Martin was married with two children and worked as a stonemason. He served as a private with the Football Battalion of the Middlesex Regiment during the First World War. Martin was shot in the jaw near Beaumont-Hamel in April 1916 and remained in France until November 1916, before returning to Britain for recuperation and being medically discharged in August 1917.

Career statistics

References

English footballers
English Football League players
British Army personnel of World War I
Middlesex Regiment soldiers
1887 births
Footballers from Gateshead
Hull City A.F.C. players
Grimsby Town F.C. players
Aberdare Athletic F.C. players
Cleethorpes Town F.C. players
Association football midfielders
Association football fullbacks
1967 deaths
Stonemasons
Military personnel from Newcastle upon Tyne